The Pólya Prize is a prize in mathematics, awarded by the London Mathematical Society. Second only to the triennial De Morgan Medal in prestige among the society's awards, it is awarded in the years that are not divisible by three – those in which the De Morgan Medal is not awarded. First given in 1987, the prize is named after Hungarian mathematician George Pólya, who was a member of the society for over 60 years.

The prize is awarded "in recognition of outstanding creativity in, imaginative exposition of, or distinguished contribution to, mathematics within the United Kingdom".
It cannot be given to anyone who has previously received the De Morgan Medal.

List of winners
 1987 John Horton Conway
 1988 C. T. C. Wall
 1990 Graeme B. Segal
 1991 Ian G. Macdonald
 1993 David Rees
 1994 David Williams
 1996 David Edmunds
 1997 John Hammersley
 1999 Simon Donaldson
 2000 Terence Lyons
 2002 Nigel Hitchin
 2003 Angus Macintyre
 2005 Michael Berry
 2006 Peter Swinnerton-Dyer
 2008 David Preiss
 2009 Roger Heath-Brown
 2011 E. Brian Davies
 2012 Dan Segal
 2014 Miles Reid
 2015 Boris Zilber
 2017 Alex Wilkie
 2018 Karen Vogtmann
 2020 Martin W. Liebeck
 2021 Ehud Hrushovski

See also 
 List of mathematics awards

References
 List of LMS prize winners London Mathematical Society
 The Pólya Prize of the London Mathematical Society MacTutor History of Mathematics

British awards
Awards established in 1987
Awards of the London Mathematical Society